DERYtelecom is a cable television distributor Internet service provider and Phone in Canada based in Saguenay, Quebec. The company operates in 13 regions in Quebec in municipalities of 600 residents or less. As of 2019, the distributor had roughly 100,000 subscribers. Since 14 December 2020, DERYtelecom is the propriety of Cogeco

References

External links
 DERYtelecom

Cable and DBS companies of Canada
Internet service providers of Canada
Companies based in Quebec
Saguenay, Quebec